Yuzhny Airport (Russian for "southern airport") may refer to:

 Ivanovo Yuzhny Airport, an airport in Ivanovo, Russia
 Oryol Yuzhny Airport, an airport in Oryol, Russia
 Smolensk South Airport, an airport in Smolensk, Russia
 , an airport in Taganrog, Russia
 Tashkent International Airport, an airport in Tashkent, Uzbekistan